The 2004 SCCA ProRally Season was the 32nd and last season of the SCCA ProRally and won by Canadian Patrick Richard from British Columbia and his co-driver and sister Nathalie. Nine rounds were held from January 2004 to October 2004. It was the final season of SCCA ProRally as the series became known as Rally America from 2005.

Teams and Drivers

Calendar
Sno*Drift Rally won by Pat Richard
Oregon Trail ProRally won by Pat Richard
Rim of the World ProRally won by Pat Richard
Susquehannock Trail ProRally won by Shane Mitchell
Pikes Peak ProRally won by Leon Styles
Maine Forest Rally won by Paul Choiniere
Ojibwe Forests Rally won by Lauchlin O'Sullivan
Colorado Cog Rally won by Leon Styles
Lake Superior ProRally won by Seamus Burke

References

External links
 2004 Results at rallyracingnews.com

2004 in motorsport
2004 in rallying